Tiro al piccione (internationally released as Pigeon Shoot and Pigeon Shooting) is a 1961 Italian drama film. It represents the directorial debut film of Giuliano Montaldo.

The film entered the competition at Venice Film Festival in 1961.

Cast 
Jacques Charrier: Marco Laudato
Eleonora Rossi Drago: Anna
Gastone Moschin: Pasquini
Francisco Rabal: Elia
Franco Balducci: Garrani
Loris Bazzocchi: Giuliani
Enzo Cerusico: Pastorello
Franca Nuti: Donna col marito al fronte
Enrico Glori: Oratore fascista
Sergio Fantoni: Nardi
Carlo D'Angelo: Mattei

References

External links

1961 films
Italian drama films
Films directed by Giuliano Montaldo
Films scored by Carlo Rustichelli
1961 drama films
1961 directorial debut films
1960s Italian films